Kodihalli may refer to:
 Kodihalli, Ramanagara, a locality in Ramanagara, Karnataka
 Kodihalli, Kanakapura, a village in Kanakapura taluk in Ramanagara district, Karnataka
 Kodihalli, Bangalore, a locality in Bangalore, Karnataka
 Kodihalli,Arsikere, a village in arsikere taluk in hassan district ,karnataka